The Mexican National Women's Championship is a women's professional wrestling championship for female wrestlers sanctioned by the Comisión de Box y Lucha Libre Mexico D.F. (the Mexico City Boxing and Wrestling Commission). While the Commission sanctions the title, it does not promote the events in which the Championship is defended. The championship is currently promoted by the Mexican Lucha Libre wrestling based promotion Consejo Mundial de Lucha Libre (CMLL) and has in the past also been promoted by the Mexican-based Asistencia Asesoría y Administración (AAA) promotion.

The championship is one of the oldest, still-promoted female professional wrestling championship, preceded only by the NWA World Women's Championship that was created in 1954 while the first Mexican women's champion was crowned in 1955. The current champion is Dark Silueta, who defeated Reyna Isis on November 16, 2021, to win the championship. She is the 23nd champion of the modern era.

History
Female wrestlers first appeared in Mexico in 1935 when United States-based wrestlers Mae Stein, Teddy Meyers, Katherine Hart, Louise Francis and Dot Apollo wrestled in Arena México. Women would not be allowed to wrestle in Mexico again until 1942 and then again in 1945 but each time Mexican promoters brought in women from the United States. In the early-, to mid-1950s Jack O'Brien, a successful wrestler in the 1930s and 1940s, trained several Mexican women. The group included Chabela Romero, La Enfermera, Irma González, Rosita Williams, and La Dama Enmascarada ("The Masked Lady"). The first recognized Mexican Women's champion was La Dama Enmascarada who won a tournament in Monterrey in the first half of 1955. The title was originally identified simply as the "Women's Championship" or alternately the "Mexican Women's Championship" in contemporary newspaper coverage. The title would later be won by Irma González on a show held in the el Toreo de Cuatro Caminos bullfighting arena in Naucalpan, State of Mexico. In 1961 then-champion Irma Gonzales was billed as defending the "Occidente" Women's Championship in Guadalajara, but records of the various "Occidente" ("Western States") championships contain no reference to a women's championship before or after 1961, leading to researchers concluding that it was most likely González Women's Championship that was defended that day just labelled as "Occidente".

In the late 1950s the Regent of Mexico City, Ernesto P. Uruchurtu, banned women's wrestling in Mexico City, effectively relegating them to minor shows in other Mexican states. The championship lineage from 1959 until the Mexico City ban on women's wrestling was lifted in Mexico City in 1986 is unclear and was undocumented for a long period of time. In 1986 the Comisión de Box y Lucha Libre Mexico D.F. (the Mexico City Boxing and Wrestling Commission) started licensing female wrestlers to work in Mexico City and officially recognized Reyna Gallegos as the "Mexican National Women's Champion", based on the fact that she was the reigning Mexican Women's Champion, adopting the lineage of the championship retroactively. The commission allowed Empresa Mexicana de Lucha Libre ("Mexican Wrestling Enterprise") to promote the championship and determine who should challenge or win it. Unlike most championships that belong to a specific promotion the Mexican National Women's Championship was not owned by a single promotion, instead, promoters holding shows in Mexico City could petition the commission to have the champion work on their show. From the early 1990s the championship essentially became exclusive to Consejo Mundial de Lucha Libre (CMLL, a renamed EMLL) as it was only defended on CMLL shows for years and only won by wrestlers under CMLL contract. In 1995 Martha Villalobos won the championship on an AAA show, officially transitioning control from CMLL to AAA. In 2004 Lady Apache won the championship from Tiffany on an AAA show, and took the title with her when she joined CMLL in 2005. Lady Apache would later win the CMLL World Women's Championship and then vacated the Mexican National Women's Championship. The championship has remained under CMLL's control since then.

Reigns
The current champion is Reyna Isis, who defeated La Metálica on September 25, 2020, to win the championship. It is her first reign with the title, she is the 22nd champion since the Mexico City Boxing and Wrestling Commission sanctioned the championship, and the 31st documented champion overall. Martha Villalobos holds the record for the longest verified individual reign with 1,399 days while Lady Apache's two reigns combine for 1,470 days the longest verified reign of any champion. Due to the undocumented periods prior to 1986 it is possible that someone else has actually held the championship longer, but no verification of such a fact has been found. Isabel Romero has held the title three times, the most for any champion, while five women have held the championship twice since it was officially sanctioned in 1986; Lady Apache, La Sirenita, Tiffany, Martha Villalobos and Zuleyma. La Diabólica holds the record for the shortest documented title reign, with 50 days.

Rules
From 1986 the championship has been classified as a "National" title, which means that officially non-Mexican citizens are prohibited from challenging or holding the championship, just like all other Mexican National Championships. There have been instances where those rules have not been strictly enforced, including Puerto Rican Zeuxis winning the championship. Later CMLL announced that she actually had joint citizenship in Puerto Rico and Mexico after she won the championship in 2015. It is unclear if Zeuxis' Puerto Rican heritage is a storyline or not.< All title matches take place under best two-out-of-three falls rules. On occasion single fall title matches have taken place, for example when promoting CMLL title matches in Japan, conforming to the traditions of the local promotion, for instance when Princesa Blanca defended the championship against Lady Apache in Korakuen Hall in Tokyo, Japan. As it is a professional wrestling championship, it is not won legitimately; it is instead won via a scripted ending to a match or awarded to a wrestler because of a storyline.

Title history

Reigns by combined length
Key

Footnotes

References

Consejo Mundial de Lucha Libre championships
Mexican national wrestling championships
Women's professional wrestling championships
National professional wrestling championships
Lucha Libre AAA Worldwide championships